OTO Award TV Female Actor

Currently held by  Zuzana Mauréry

First awarded  | Last awarded 2000 | Present 

OTO Award for TV Female Actor has been bestowed to the most recognized female actors of the past year in Slovakia since 2000. In years 2010 and 2011, the award was split into two equivalent categories depending on a genre, TV drama or TV comedy. From 2012, the general category is held.

Winners and nominees

2000s

2010s

Superlatives

 Notes
┼ Denotes also a winner in two or more of the main categories. † Denotes also a winner of the Absolute OTO category. ‡ Denotes also an inductee into the Hall of Fame OTO.

Associated categories
OTO Award TV Female Actor – Drama

First awarded  | Last awarded 2010 | 2011

TV Female Actor – Drama

 2 nominations
 Emília Vášáryová
 Diana Mórová

OTO Award TV Female Actor – Comedy

First awarded  | Last awarded 2010 | 2011

TV Female Actor – Comedy

 2 awards
 Petra Polnišová

 2 nominations
 Petra Polnišová
 Helena Krajčiová

References

External links
 OTO Awards (Official website)
 OTO Awards - Winners and nominees (From 2000 onwards)
 OTO Awards - Winners and nominees (From 2000 to 2009)

Actor, female
Slovak culture
Slovak television awards
Awards established in 2000